Fraley is a surname. Notable people with the surname include:

Frederick Fraley (1804–1901), American businessman and politician
Hank Fraley (born 1977), American football player
Jake Fraley (born 1995), American baseball player
Jamie Fraley (born 1986), American woman missing since 2008
Oscar Fraley (1914–1994), American author
Pat Fraley (born 1949), American voice actor